The Kaleo Power Station is a  solar power plant in Ghana. The solar farm is owned and was developed by the Volta River Authority, between February 2020 and August 2022. The power off-taker is GRIDCo (Ghana Grid Company), which integrates the electricity into the national grid.

Location
The geographical coordinates of Kaleo Solar Farm are:10°10'27.0"N, 2°32'01.0"W (Latitude:10.174167; Longitude:-2.533611).

Overview
The power station has a generation capacity of 13 MW in the first phase. The second phase with new generation capacity of 15 MW is expected to start construction in 2022 and reach commercial commissioning in 2023. This will bring generation capacity at Kaleo to a total of 28 MW.

This power station, together with Lawra Solar Power Station, with capacity of 4 MW are intended to supply stable renewable power to the city of Wa and the surrounding metropolis.

Developers
The power station was developed by Volta River Authority (VRA), who also own and operate the solar farm.

Construction and funding
The construction costs for Kaleo Solar Farm (13 MW) and Lawra Solar Farm (4 MW) were reported to be approximately US$25 million (€20.2 million), with loan support from the German Development Bank (KfW). VRA is expected to borrow another €15 million from KfW to add another 15 MW in the second phase at Kaleo.

See also

List of power stations in Ghana

References

External links
 Volta River Authority Webpage

Solar power stations in Ghana
Upper West Region
2022 establishments in Ghana
Energy infrastructure completed in 2022